Melbu is a village in Hadsel Municipality in Nordland county, Norway.  The village is located on the island of Hadseløya on the northern shore of the Hadselfjorden.  Melbu is one of two population centres on the island of Hadseløya, and it is called "The Pearl of Vesteraalen". The other being the town of Stokmarknes in the north. Melbu is host to the annual Sommer-Melbu festival.

Melbu Church is located in this village. Melbu is also a school centre in Vesterålen, and has a ferry connection to the village of Fiskebøl on the island of Austvågøya to the south via the Melbu-Fiskebøl Ferry.

Economy
Melbu has one of the biggest fish processing facilities of Norway Seafoods/Aker Seafoods in Northern Norway. Several main factory trawler licenses are permanently related to the factory facilities in Melbu. There are also other industry facilities connected to fish processing, aquaculture, and other marine industry in Melbu. The Norwegian Fishing Industry Museum is located in the town's former Neptune Herring Oil Factory.

References

External links 
 Melbu site
 Summer-Melbu festival

Hadsel
Villages in Nordland
Populated places of Arctic Norway